Badmeaningood Vol.4 is a compilation of tracks chosen and mixed by British turntablists Scratch Perverts. The album was released by Whoa Music & Ultimate Dilemma, an independent record label which was part of the NewsCorp Music Group before it was absorbed into A&E Records in 2003. The series was started by the author A. W. Wilde.

Track listing

 Scratch Perverts - "Intro" – 1:33
 Lalo Schifrin - "Scorpio's Theme" – 2:49
 The Specials - "Ghost Town" – 5:20
 24-Carat Black - "Ghetto: Misfortune's Wealth" – 3:32
 Kool G Rap & DJ Polo - "Streets of New York" – 3:43
 London Posse - "Money Mad" – 3:12
 Dr. Octagon - "Bear Witness" - 2:27
 Mickey & the Soul Generation - "Iron Leg" – 2:09
 DJ Shadow - "Entropy" – 3:34
 Schoolly D - "Saturday Night" – 3:43
 Show & A.G. - "Represent" – 3:39
 Gang Starr - "Speak Ya Clout" – 3:46
 M.O.P. - "Ante Up" – 3:22
 Minnie Ripperton - "Les Fleurs" – 3:15
 Sister Nancy - "Bam Bam" – 2:26
 Super Cat - "Oh It's You" (Album version) – 1:28
 Blackalicious - "Alphabet Aerobics" – 2:05
 Squarepusher - "My Red Hot Car" – 3:07
 Origin Unknown - "Valley of the Shadows" – 1:43
 Scratch Perverts - "Beat Down" – 4:17

See also 
 Badmeaningood Vol.2 (2002, by Roots Manuva)
 Badmeaningood Vol.3 (2003, by Peanut Butter Wolf)

Scratch Perverts albums
Hip hop compilation albums
2003 compilation albums